The Karmazinai mound (also called Viršupis) is a burial mound and hill fort (piliakalnis) in Vilnius district municipality, Lithuania.

See also
List of hillforts in Lithuania

References

Hill forts in Lithuania
Vilnius District Municipality